The 1922–23 Toronto St. Patricks season was the sixth season of operation of the Toronto National Hockey League (NHL) franchise. The St. Pats failed to repeat as Stanley Cup champions, not qualifying for the playoffs, by finishing third.

Offseason

Regular season

Final standings

Record vs. opponents

Schedule and results

Playoffs
The St. Pats did not qualify for the playoffs.

Player statistics

Awards and records

Transactions
 October 9, 1922: Signed Free Agent Ganton Scott
 October 25, 1922: Signed Free Agent Gerry Denoird
 December 18, 1922: Acquired Jack Adams from Vancouver Millionaires (PCHA) for Corbett Denneny

See also
1922–23 NHL season

References

Toronto St. Patricks seasons
Toronto
Toronto